Hany Atiyo (born 8 November 1983) is an Egyptian former professional boxer who competed from 2009 to 2020 and held the ABU light-heavyweight title from 2011 to 2012.

Professional boxing record

External links

1983 births
Living people
Egyptian male boxers
African Boxing Union champions
People from Kafr El Sheikh Governorate
Cruiserweight boxers
21st-century Egyptian people